The Roman Catholic Diocese of Cartago  is a diocese located in the city of Cartago in the Ecclesiastical province of Cali in Colombia.

History
 16 March 1962: Established as Diocese of Cartago from the Diocese of Cali

Bishops
José Gabriel Calderón Contreras (26 April 1962 – 19 April 1995)
Luis Madrid Merlano (19 April 1995 – 30 March 2010) appointed Archbishop of Nueva Pamplona
José Alejandro Castaño Arbeláez, O.A.R. (21 October 2010 – 31 October 2020)
César Alcides Balbín Tamayo (19 October 2021 – present)

Other priests of this diocese who became bishops
Edgar de Jesús Garcia Gil, appointed Auxiliary Bishop of Cali in 1992
Edgar Aristizábal Quintero, appointed Auxiliary Bishop of Medellín in 2011
Juan Carlos Cárdenas Toro, appointed Auxiliary Bishop of Cali in 2015

See also
Roman Catholicism in Colombia

Sources

External links
 Catholic Hierarchy
 GCatholic.org

Roman Catholic dioceses in Colombia
Roman Catholic Ecclesiastical Province of Cali
Christian organizations established in 1962
Roman Catholic dioceses and prelatures established in the 20th century
1962 establishments in Colombia